North Point Mall is a shopping mall, located in Alpharetta, Georgia (a suburb of Atlanta). The mall opened on October 20, 1993 as one of the largest shopping malls in the country. The mall was the second to last property built by Homart Development Company.  

The mall's anchor stores are Dillard's, JCPenney, Macy's, and Von Maur.

History
Like Pembroke Lakes Mall which opened in the previous year, this mall opened with space for 6 anchor stores, 5 of which were initially occupied: Rich's, Lord & Taylor, Mervyn's, JCPenney, and Sears. One of the more distinctive elements of the mall was the Rich's store, which was designed with numerous distinctive historical elements and a more elaborate design to pay tribute to its lost flagship store in downtown Atlanta, which had closed only two years earlier. Though it became a Macy's in 2005, the outside of the store retains the elaborate sculptings of the original store.

Dillard's filled the sixth pad on the southwest side of the mall as their first Atlanta location (this was likewise done at Pembroke Lakes a year before) along with a parking deck in 1996. As Mervyn's left the following year, their space was filled by Parisian, which had 4 other area stores and made the mall more upscale. With the exception of Lord & Taylor, the mall had the same anchor lineup as The Mall at Stonecrest, which opened in 2001.

The mall was renovated in 2003, when the interior was modernized to introduce more sitting areas, and again in 2004, when an escalator was moved from the East Court near Starbucks to the Sears wing of the mall. In 2019, many of the mall’s interior atriums were modernized with new sitting areas and flooring. This also included the addition of an LED color changing tree.

In June 2004, The Cheesecake Factory opened its third Georgia location and first location outside of Atlanta at North Point. The store is located in the mall parking lot just beyond the parking deck. A walking path known as the "yellow brick road" connects the restaurant to the mall's Center Court.

Competition and changing tenants
In 2005, Lord & Taylor was repositioned and shuttered entirely.
Parisian vacated in September 2007, after it was acquired by Belk, which opened a store of its own in the Lord & Taylor building which later closed in September 2009. The new design includes reddish brick, a cupola, and columns to echo Georgia and the South. The store opened in November 2011. 

The former Parisian store converted to a 12-screen AMC Theatres featuring a MacGuffins bar, recliners, Coca-Cola Freestyle, IMAX, and ETX in September 2012.

In recent years the mall has begun to face competition with online shopping as well as newer mixed-use developments, particularly Avalon — high end stores such as Apple, Gap, and Pottery Barn left North Point for Avalon. Closer to Atlanta, Simon Property Group-owned flagship malls Phipps Plaza and Lenox Square both received major upgrades in the 2010s, and another new mixed-use development in southern Forsyth County called Halcyon, which opened in 2019.

Sears closed in June 2018 during a series of closures.

New mixed-use development
In February 2019, the Alpharetta City Council approved plans for a new 83-acre mixed-use development on the northeast side of the mall, featuring apartments, restaurants, new retail areas, small parks and trails, a rock wall, a play fountain, and a lake. The former Sears is set to be demolished for the project, and the playground inside the mall will be expanded. Responding to the successful vote to go ahead with the development, Alpharetta mayor Jim Gilvin said "[i]f you do it right, it's going to be special".

The city of Alpharetta is considering implementing a tax-allocation district (TAD) in order to fund the re-development, which would funnel property taxes collected from the surrounding area directly towards project infrastructure, including sewers and roads. Similar TAD schemes have been used to help finance two other re-developments in the Atlanta area: Atlantic Station and the BeltLine. These sorts of tax programs attract opposition, as they can remain in place for years, if not decades. Both Fulton County and Fulton County Schools would need to agree to give up their respective shares of the property taxes.

Current anchors
AMC Theatres (2012-present)
Dillard's (1996-present)
JCPenney (October 20, 1993-present)
Macy's (March 6, 2005-present)
Von Maur (November 2011-present)

Former anchors
Belk (2007–September 2009)
Dino Safari (November 19, 2021–April 8, 2022) 
Lord & Taylor (October 20, 1993–2005)
Mervyn's (October 20, 1993-April 1997)
Parisian (November 1997–September 2007)
Rich's (October 20, 1993–March 6, 2005)
Sears (October 20, 1993–June 2018)

Carousel
A carousel that sits behind a floor-to-ceiling window in the food court was crafted in Brooklyn, New York by the Fabricon Carousel Company. The carousel's hand-painted fiberglass animals were modeled after those of a vintage Victorian carousel on Coney Island. It was shipped to Atlanta in December 1992 (originally to be displayed in the Perimeter Mall) and sat in a warehouse near Duluth for 8 months. On August 1, 1993, it was brought to the then uncompleted North Point Mall, and was assembled in a huge, unfinished, high-ceiling room that is now known as the Food Court. Shoppers saw it operate for the very first time a few weeks after the grand opening. The carousel was supposed to have been the centerpiece of the mall; however, due to a broken part it did not operate until a few weeks after opening day of the mall.

References

External links
Sky City: North Point Mall
Official Site

Buildings and structures in Fulton County, Georgia
Shopping malls in Georgia (U.S. state)
Shopping malls in the Atlanta metropolitan area
Tourist attractions in Fulton County, Georgia
Shopping malls established in 1993
1993 establishments in Georgia (U.S. state)